The women's 3000 metres race of the 2013–14 ISU Speed Skating World Cup 2, arranged in the Utah Olympic Oval, in Salt Lake City, United States, was held on November 15, 2013.

Martina Sáblíková of the Czech Republic won the race, while Claudia Pechstein of Germany came second, and Antoinette de Jong of the Netherlands came third. De Jong's time of 3:59.49 was a new world record for juniors. Ayaka Kikuchi of Japan won the Division B race.

Results
The race took place on Friday, November 15, with Division B scheduled in the morning session, at 08:45, and Division A scheduled in the afternoon session, at 15:16.

Division A

Division B

References

Women 3000
2